Granollers Centre is a Rodalies de Catalunya railway station serving Granollers in Catalonia, Spain. It is located on the Barcelona–Cerbère railway, just next to the Granollers main square.

References

External links
 Granollers Centre listing at the Rodalies de Catalunya website 
 Granollers Centre listing at the Adif website
 Information and photos of the station at trenscat.cat 

Railway stations in Catalonia
Railway stations in Spain opened in 1854
Rodalies de Catalunya stations
Transport in Vallès Oriental
Granollers